The 2008 presidential campaign of Hillary Rodham Clinton, then junior United States senator from New York, was announced on her website on January 20, 2007. Hillary Clinton was previously the First Lady of the United States and First Lady of Arkansas prior to her election as U.S. Senator from New York. She is also the wife of former President Bill Clinton. Clinton was the source of much media speculation since having expressed interest in being a candidate in the 2008 presidential election since at least October 2002.

Following her announcement of an exploratory committee and candidacy filing on January 20, 2007, with the FEC, she began fundraising and campaigning activities. For several months Clinton led opinion polls among Democratic candidates by substantial margins until Senator Barack Obama pulled close to or even with her. Clinton then regained her polling lead, winning many polls by double digits; by autumn 2007 she was leading all other Democratic candidates by wide margins in national polls.  She placed third in the Iowa caucus behind Barack Obama and John Edwards, and trailed considerably in polls shortly thereafter in New Hampshire before staging a comeback and finishing first in the primary there. 
She went on to win a plurality of votes in Nevada, but won fewer delegates in Nevada than Obama, then lost by a large margin in South Carolina. On Super Tuesday, Clinton won the most populous states, including California and New York, while Obama won more states total. The two earned a nearly equal number of delegates and a nearly equal share of the total popular vote. Clinton then lost the next 12 caucuses and primaries to Obama, and lost the overall delegate lead to him for the first time. After an increasingly aggressive round of campaigning, Clinton broke the string of losses with wins in the Rhode Island, Ohio, and Texas primaries.

Clinton subsequently lost in Wyoming, Mississippi, Montana, North Carolina and Oregon, and won in Pennsylvania, Indiana, West Virginia, Kentucky, Puerto Rico, and South Dakota. On the final day of primaries on June 3, 2008, Obama had gained enough pledged- and super-delegates to become the presumptive nominee; she then suspended her campaign on June 7, 2008, and endorsed Barack Obama.

While losing the delegate count, and thus the nomination, she earned more popular votes than Barack Obama (though unlike Clinton's name, Obama's name wasn't on the ballot in the 2008 Michigan Democratic primary; had all of the "Uncommitted" votes in the Michigan primary been counted as votes for Obama, Obama would have very narrowly won the popular vote as well). In the general election, Barack Obama defeated Senator and Republican nominee John McCain of Arizona, and nominated Clinton as the 67th Secretary of State, an office in which she served until February 2013.

In the 2016 election, Clinton would go on to become the Democratic presidential nominee, but was defeated by Republican nominee Donald Trump.

Pre-announcement events
In July 2005, the magazine Washington Monthly ran two side-by-side articles debating the pros and cons of a potential Clinton candidacy.

Announcement of candidacy
Clinton announced formation of her exploratory committee on January 20, 2007, with a post on her website.  In a statement on her website, she left no doubt that she had decided to run: "I'm in. And I'm in to win." She filed the official paperwork for an exploratory committee.

Staff and policy team

Initial team
Clinton's campaign was run by a team of advisers and political operatives. Patti Solis Doyle was the first female Hispanic to manage a presidential campaign, which she did from its inception. Deputy campaign manager Mike Henry had managed Tim Kaine's successful campaign for Governor of Virginia in 2005 and coordinated the Democratic advertising efforts for the Senate elections of 2006.  Mark Penn, CEO of PR firm Burson-Marsteller and president of polling company Penn, Schoen & Berland was described as Clinton's "strategic genius" in a role likened to that which Karl Rove played in George W. Bush's campaigns. Howard Wolfson, a veteran of New York politics, served as the campaign spokesperson. Evelyn S. Lieberman, who worked for Clinton when she was First Lady and served as Deputy White House Chief of Staff, was the chief operating officer of the campaign.  Ann Lewis, White House communications director from 1997 to 2000, was Senior Advisor to the campaign.  Cheryl Mills was general counsel for the campaign.  Jonathan Mantz was finance director, Mandy Grunwald the lead media consultant, Neera Tanden the campaign's policy director, Kim Molstre the director of scheduling and long-term planning, Phil Singer the deputy communications director, Leecia Eve a senior policy advisor, Nathaniel Pearlman the chief technology officer, and Minyon Moore a senior policy advisor. Other campaign workers also date from the "Hillaryland" team of the White House years.

Other advisers and supporters included former Secretary of State Madeleine Albright, Richard Holbrooke, Sandy Berger, Wesley Clark, former Rep. and vice presidential candidate Geraldine Ferraro, former Governor and U.S. Secretary of Education Richard Riley, and former Secretary of Defense William Perry.  Less well-known but key region and subject specialists were the focus of an intense recruiting battle between her and fellow candidate Barack Obama.

An October 2007 study of ongoing presidential campaign staffs showed that 8 of her 14 senior staff were women, as were 12 of her 20 top paid staff and 85 of her 161 nominally paid staff; overall she had the largest percentage of women in her campaign of any candidate surveyed other than Mike Huckabee.

February 2008 reorganization
On February 10, 2008, Solis Doyle ceased duties as campaign manager, and become a senior adviser, traveling with Clinton. Although Solis Doyle claimed the unanticipated length of the primary campaign led to her to resign the post, campaign insiders confirmed that she was ousted. Solis Doyle had survived three previous efforts to oust her.

Maggie Williams was appointed campaign manager; she had been Clinton's chief of staff at the White House. In January, Williams had been brought in on a thirty-day assignment as a senior advisor, and had demanded clarity in the chain of command with the authority to settle internal strategy and policy disputes, threatening to leave the campaign.
Within the next few days, Deputy Campaign Manager Mike Henry also stepped down, as did two top staff members for her web-based operations.
In two in-depth accounts by Joshua Green in The Atlantic, he attributed Solis Doyle's downfall to her failure to manage campaign spending, her inability to prevent factional disputes within the campaign, and her not recognizing Obama's candidacy as a serious threat earlier.  Henry's departure was expected, as Solis Doyle had originally brought him in to the campaign.

April 2008 strategist change
Chief campaign strategist Mark Penn resigned on April 6, 2008, amid controversy surrounding his work with the Colombian government and the free trade bill opposed by many big unions. Penn resigned after news surfaced he had met with the Colombian ambassador, not as Clinton's adviser but as CEO of his P.R. firm, though he admitted the subject of the meeting was the trade bill. Penn was replaced with Geoff Garin, a respected pollster, who became the chief strategist.  He was slated to continue work for the campaign via his polling firm.

Fundraising

Methods and goals
In January 2007 Clinton announced that she would forgo public financing for both the primary and general elections due to the spending limits imposed when accepting the federal money.  She had $14 million left from her 2006 Senate race, which put her in a good starting position compared to other Democratic candidates. Clinton insiders said the senator's goal was to raise at least $60 million in 2007.  Longtime Democratic political and finance leader
Terry McAuliffe was Clinton's campaign chair.

HillRaisers
"Bundlers" that collected more than $100,000 for her campaign became known as "HillRaisers"; (a play on the expression hellraiser) and were asked to raise as much as $1 million each. Elton John raised $2.5 million in a benefit concert for Clinton at Radio City Music Hall, on April 9.

By August 2007, there were 233 HillRaisers.  They included Vernon E. Jordan, Jr., Steven Rattner, New Jersey Governor Jon Corzine, U.S. Senator Dianne Feinstein, John Grisham, Magic Johnson, Ronald Perelman, Pennsylvania Governor Ed Rendell, Steven Spielberg and many others.

In late August 2007, HillRaiser Norman Hsu came into considerable negative publicity when it was revealed that he was a 15-year-long fugitive on investment fraud charges and had also possibly engaged in violations of campaign finance law as a "bundler".

Results

On April 1, 2007, Clinton announced she had raised $26 million during the preceding three months, along with an additional transfer of $10 million from her Senate campaign account to her presidential account.  This dwarfed the previous record for the comparable quarter, which was $9 million by Al Gore in 1999.

For the second quarter of 2007, Clinton raised about $27 million, less than Obama's newly set records for the quarter of $32.5 million in donations from 258,000 contributors but more than all other candidates.  According to OpenSecrets, during the first six months of the year, about 70% of her funds came from donors giving the maximum $2,300; this compared to 44% for Obama and 42% for Edwards.

For the third quarter of 2007, which typically sees lower numbers than the rest of the year, Clinton led all candidates with $27 million raised and with 100,000 new contributors.  This beat Obama's $20 million and allowed Clinton to apportion some of the amount for an expected general election race rather than the primary season.

In the fourth quarter of 2007, Clinton raised approximately $20 million, bringing her total for the year to more than $100 million.  This equaled the amount raised by Obama in the quarter, and was also similar to what Republican fundraising  Ron Paul garnered during the quarter.

During January 2008, Clinton raised $13.5 million.  This paled in comparison to Obama's $32 million for the same month, and Clinton was forced to loan her campaign $5 million from her and Bill Clinton's personal assets.  Further, Clinton's campaign ended January with $7.6 million in debt, aside from the personal loan.  Rebounding from weak fundraising in January 2008, Sen. Clinton expected to raise $35 million in February 2008—a figure rival Sen. Barack Obama's campaign said it would surpass. On March 6, 2008, it was revealed that Senator Obama raised a record $55 million in February, what the Associated Press reported as the largest amount of funds raised in one month in the history of Presidential primaries.

In April, it was revealed that the Clinton campaign began the month $1 million in debt. While the campaign had $20 million cash on hand, only $9 million was available for the primary and the campaign had $10 million in debt. Clinton adviser Howard Wolfson acknowledged the debt, but noted that "The money continues to come in strongly" and that the campaign would be paying off the debts.

Clinton left the race with $22.5 million in debt, at least $11.4 million of which came from her own pocket.

By the conclusion of the election cycle in November 2008, Clinton's campaign was severely in debt; she owed millions of dollars to outside vendors and wrote off the $13 million that she lent it herself.  She continued to raise funds, but then her January 2009 confirmation as U.S. Secretary of State prevented her from doing any political fundraising herself.  During the first quarter of 2009, a surprisingly large $5.6 million came into her campaign, enabling her to pay off all creditors other than her pollster Mark Penn, to whom the campaign still owed $2.3 million.

Over time, Bill Clinton took up most of the fundraising burden, sending out fundraising letters, signing campaign memorabilia, and selling appearances with him. By the start of 2012, the debt was down to about $250,000.  A team of Obama donors, including Steve Spinner and Jane Watson Stetson, who wanted to thank Clinton for her service during the Obama administration, took up the cause; they used public records to find potential donors who still had not reached contribution limits for 2008.  In addition, the Clinton campaign's donor list was rented out to Obama's 2012 re-election campaign, bringing in around $63,000 in October 2012. The Clinton campaign finally declared it had paid off all its debt in a report filed at the beginning of 2013, showing in fact a $205,000 surplus, just as Clinton was about to end her tenure as Secretary of State.

Campaign finance irregularities
Norman Hsu was a businessman with a background in the apparel industry. By 2007 he was a prominent fundraiser for the Clinton campaign, having achieved HillRaiser status, having co-hosted a $1 million fundraiser at wealthy Democratic Party supporter Ron Burkle's Beverly Hills estate, and having been scheduled to co-host a major gala fundraising event featuring music legend Quincy Jones.

On August 28, 2007, The Wall Street Journal reported that Hsu may have engaged in improper actions during the collection of "bundled" campaign contribution.  The Clinton campaign rose to Hsu's defense, saying "Norman Hsu is a longtime and generous supporter of the Democratic party and its candidates, including Senator Clinton. During Mr. Hsu's many years of active participation in the political process, there has been no question about his integrity or his commitment to playing by the rules, and we have absolutely no reason to call his contributions into question."

The next day, on August 29, The Los Angeles Times reported that Hsu was a longtime fugitive, having failed to appear for sentencing for a 1992 fraud conviction.  The Clinton campaign reversed course, saying it would give to charity the $23,000 that Hsu personally contributed to her presidential campaign, her Senate re-election and her political action committee.  The campaign said it did not plan to give away funds that Hsu had collected from other donors.

Although Hsu had donated to other Democratic candidates, scrutiny was focused on the Clinton campaign, with mainstream press reports asking why the campaign had been unable to take steps to discover Hsu's past. and speculating that opponents would liken developments to the 1996 United States campaign finance controversy.  Clinton said the Hsu revelations were "a big surprise to everybody." She added that, "When you have as many contributors as I’m fortunate enough to have, we do the very best job we can based on the information available to us to make appropriate vetting decisions."

On September 5, Hsu failed to appear for a court hearing and became a fugitive again.  The Clinton campaign said, "We believe that Mr. Hsu, like any individual who has obligations before the court, should be meeting them, and he should do so now."  Hsu was recaptured less than 48 hours later.

By September 10, newspaper reports indicated that the FBI was looking into the legitimacy of an investment pool that Hsu had been running at the time of his large-scale contributing.  Moreover, Irvine, California businessman Jack Cassidy said he had, as early as June 2007, tried to warn authorities and the Clinton campaign that Hsu was running an illicit enterprise, and that both officials and the Clinton campaign had been non-responsive.  A California Democratic Party query at the time in June was responded to by the Clinton campaign's western finance director: "I can tell you with 100 certainty that Norman Hsu is not involved in a ponzi scheme. He is completely legit."  The campaign later said it had further looked at Hsu's public records at the time, but that no problems had emerged.

Later on September 10, the Clinton campaign announced it would return the full $850,000 in donations that Hsu had raised from others: "In light of recent events and allegations that Mr. Norman Hsu engaged in an illegal investment scheme, we have decided out of an abundance of caution to return the money he raised for our campaign. An estimated 260 donors this week will receive refunds totaling approximately $850,000 from the campaign."  In doing so, the Clinton camp set a precedent for how campaigns should deal with potential "bundling" scandals.  The campaign also announced it would put into place tougher procedures for vetting major contributors, including running criminal background checks.  Hsu-raised bundles had also gone to Clinton's political action committee and to her 2006 Senate re-election campaign; Clinton officials were undecided regarding what to do with those funds.

In the following days, campaign strategists were worried that the Hsu matter had the potential to become a major fundraising scandal that could significantly damage the campaign.  Nevertheless, the campaign indicated that it would try to get donations re-given right after the refunds, for example taking back donations if they clearly came from the donor's bank account rather than from Hsu or another third party and if the donor swears the money is their own. Clinton herself affirmed this position: "I believe that the vast majority of those two-hundred-plus donors are perfectly capable of making up their own minds."

The political watchdog organization Judicial Watch said it would try to get the U.S. Justice Department and the Senate Ethics Committee to investigate the Hsu matter. Clinton aides stressed that Hsu had never received favorable treatment from her: "The Senate office had no official contact with him, and undertook no actions on his behalf."  Clinton herself called the whole affair "a rude awakening to all of us," meaning other campaigns as well.

By October 2007 the Hsu matter had quieted down. Clinton's third quarter campaign expenditures report showed the $800,000 in contributions, mostly Hsu-related, being returned to more than 200 donors, some of whom were surprised to see the money coming back and who said they knew not of Hsu.

In March 2007, a Pakistani immigrant named Abdul Rehman Jinnah was indicted by a grand jury for violating federal election laws. The charges stem from $30,000 in illegal contributions to Clinton's presidential campaign. Her campaign "denied any knowledge of Jinnah's scheme."

In September 2007, reports were made that William Danielczyk, private equity firm head, bundled money for Clinton from Republican Party supporters, including at least one who claimed that Danielczyk later reimbursed her, a charge Danielczyk denied. The Clinton campaign returned that donation, and said: "These allegations are troubling and we will again ask each of the individuals solicited by Mr. Danielczyk to affirm that their contributions were given with their own funds."

In October 2007, an article in the Los Angeles Times stated that, "Dishwashers, waiters and others whose jobs and dilapidated home addresses seem to make them unpromising targets for political fundraisers are pouring $1,000 and $2,000 contributions into Clinton's campaign treasury. In April, a single fundraiser in an area long known for its gritty urban poverty yielded a whopping $380,000." . The Times further stated, "At this point in the presidential campaign cycle, Clinton has raised more money than any candidate in history. Those dishwashers, waiters and street stall hawkers are part of the reason. And Clinton's success in gathering money from Chinatown's least-affluent residents stems from a two-pronged strategy: mutually beneficial alliances with powerful groups, and appeals to the hopes and dreams of people now consigned to the margins." . The New York Post reported similar findings.  The Washington Post editorialized that reports such as these appear "to be another instance in which a Clinton campaign's zeal for campaign cash overwhelms its judgment," comparing it to the 1996 Clinton-Gore finance controversy of her husband.

In December 2007, the Sri Lankan Ministry of Defence
and the Canada Free Press reported that one of Clinton's fundraisers in New Jersey, a U.S. resident who was associated with a December 12 fundraising event at the State Theatre in New Brunswick, New Jersey, was also a fundraiser for the Tamil Rehabilitation Organization, which the U.S. government has determined is a front organization for the Liberation Tigers of Tamil Eelam, which is on the U.S. State Department list of Foreign Terrorist Organizations.  In February 2008, Clinton's foreign policy adviser, Andrew Shapiro, announced that the Clinton campaign had returned the T.R.O. donations after complaints of impropriety given the outlawed T.R.O.'s terrorist links

A February 13, 2008, NPR article stated (with regard to mailing lists) that "Last year, New York Sen. Hillary Clinton took the unusual step of renting out some of her lists." The Clinton campaign responded "that the lists were rented out by her 2006 Senate campaign committee — and that the rentals took place before she began her formal campaign for president last January." Of this response NPR commented, "That would mean the rental fees went unpaid for at least 11 months. Starke, the analyst, cites Info U.S.A. data showing that on average, it settles accounts within 64 days."

Campaign developments and primaries

Delegate count

Endorsements

Media coverage
An October 29, 2007 study by the Project for Excellence in Journalism and the Joan Shorenstein Center on the Press, Politics and Public Policy found that Clinton had received the most media coverage of any of the 2008 presidential candidates, being the subject of 17 percent of all stories.  The study found that 27 percent of the stories had a favorable tone towards her, 38 percent had an unfavorable tone, with the balance neutral.

A November 12, 2007 assessment by Michael Crowley of The New Republic of relations between the Clinton campaign and the press found that regarding published stories, "the Clinton media machine [is] hyper-vigilant [and that] that no detail or editorial spin is too minor to draw a rebuke."  The Clinton camp was also reported to engage in retribution regarding stories they did not like, complaining to reporters' editors or withholding access in other areas: "Even seasoned political journalists describe reporting on Hillary as a torturous experience."  In spite of this, Crowley measured the press corps as giving Clinton "strikingly positive coverage".

By December 2007, the Clinton campaign charged that Obama's campaign was getting much more favorable media treatment than their own, especially once their campaign began faltering.  Washington Post media analyst Howard Kurtz found a number of journalists who agreed with the claim, with Mark Halperin, Time magazine's editor-at-large for political news, saying, "Your typical reporter has a thinly disguised preference that Barack Obama be the nominee. The narrative of him beating her is better than her beating him, in part because she's a Clinton and in part because he's a young African American. ... There's no one rooting for her to come back."

After Clinton's loss in Iowa and in the run-up to her apparent loss in New Hampshire and campaign collapse to come, negative media coverage of her became intense; as The Politico phrased it in retrospect, "She is carrying the burden of 16 years of contentious relations between the Clintons and the news media. ... Many journalists rushed with unseemly haste to the narrative about the fall of the Clinton machine.  Meanwhile, NBC anchor Brian Williams conceded that at least one NBC reporter said regarding Obama, "it's hard to stay objective covering this guy."

Media Matters singled out MSNBC's Chris Matthews for his consistently harsh coverage of Clinton.  During the primaries, and especially after the Iowa caucuses, Matthews was openly enthusiastic about Obama's candidacy. The New Republic reported that Matthews was "swooning" over Obama in the days leading up to the January 8 New Hampshire Democratic primary.  On the night of that election, Matthews co-anchored MSNBC's coverage. Air America Radio host Rachel Maddow and political analyst Patrick Buchanan both noted the high turnout among women, and asserted that the media coverage made Clinton a sympathetic figure to female voters. Buchanan stated that the media had "virtually canonized" Obama and behaved as if he'd been "born in Bethlehem." Maddow told Matthews that several blogs were citing him as "a symbol of what the mainstream media has done to Hillary Clinton." She added that sites such as TalkingPointsMemo.com indicated that voters felt that the media were "piling on" Clinton, and were "coming to her defense with their votes." Matthews replied sarcastically, "My influence in American politics looms over the people. I'm overwhelmed myself."  He added, "I will never underestimate Hillary Clinton again."  The next day, Matthews appeared on Joe Scarborough's MSNBC morning show and said, "I'll be brutal, the reason she's a U.S. senator, the reason she's a candidate for president, the reason she may be a front-runner is her husband messed around. That's how she got to be senator from New York. We keep forgetting it. She didn't win there on her merit." While this incited more controversy, Matthews noted that Clinton's political career started after she appeared with Senator Chuck Schumer and impressed Democratic leaders with her graceful handling of the Monica Lewinsky scandal. "I thought it was an unexceptional statement," he said. These comments, among others,  led Media Matters to launch a campaign against him and his remarks.

In a January 14 New York Times/CBS News poll, 51 percent of Democratic primary voters said the media had been harder on Clinton than on the other candidates (with especially women indicating so), while 12 percent said the media had been harder on Obama. Measurements in late January by the University of Navarra indicated that Clinton and Obama were receiving roughly equal amounts of global media attention, once Obama won the Iowa caucuses.

On February 8, Clinton's Communications Director Howard Wolfson Clinton criticized MSNBC's correspondent David Shuster "for suggesting the Clinton campaign had 'pimped out' 27-year old Chelsea by having her place phone calls to celebrities and Democratic Party 'superdelegates' on her mother's behalf."  Shuster apologized "on the air" and was temporarily suspended from the network. Wolfson argued that this was part of "a pattern of tasteless comments by MSNBC anchors about the Clinton campaign" and suggested that Clinton's participation in the scheduled, MSNBC-sponsored Cleveland debate could be jeopardized. The Clinton campaign agreed to continue with the debate after the apology was offered. In a February 12 interview with Chris Plante on WMAL-AM, "former President Bill Clinton implied the media has been unfair to his wife, stated that she was standing up to sexism when she took on NBC, and -- when asked about MSNBC's David Shuster's comments about his daughter, Chelsea -- said there was a double standard." Other critics have also argued that this incident was part of a larger pattern of "sexist coverage."

Clinton got an ironic supporter in conservative radio show host Rush Limbaugh. Limbaugh executed a plan for the listeners of Limbaugh's radio program to vote for Clinton in their states' respective primaries. Limbaugh started his Operation Chaos in order to "politically bloody up Barack Obama". This was known as "Rush the Vote" among the "Drive-by Media", a derogatory term used by Limbaugh when referencing the mainstream media, of which he does not consider himself to be a part. Though, Limbaugh wasn't supporting Clinton in hopes she would win the presidency, rather wanting to help divide the Democratic Party, so they wouldn't be well organized when the general election came.

Gender

Although Clinton was the 25th woman to run for U.S. president, she was the first female candidate to have held a highly probable chance of winning the nomination of a major party, and the presidential election. She was also the first woman to be an American presidential candidate in every primary and caucus in every state. As such, remarks surrounding her gender and appearance came to the fore.
In March 2006, actress Sharon Stone expressed her doubt about Clinton's presidential chances, saying "Hillary still has sexual power, and I don't think people will accept that. It's too threatening." On a similar note, on August 9, 2006, the sculpture The Presidential Bust of Hillary Rodham Clinton: The First Woman President of the United States of America was unveiled at the Museum of Sex in New York and attracted attention for its named focus; sculptor Daniel Edwards hoped it would spark discussion about sex, politics and celebrity.

In October 2006, Clinton's then-New York Senate race opponent, John Spencer, was reported to have commented on how much better Clinton looked now compared to in the 1970s, and speculated that she had cosmetic surgery.  On the other hand, syndicated radio talk show host Mark Levin never mentioned her name without appending a sneering "Her Thighness" to it.

In her Senate career, Senator Clinton is often seen wearing a suit. However, twice in 2006, Clinton was criticized by National Review Online editor Kathryn Jean Lopez for showing cleavage while speaking in the Senate. Lopez implored Clinton to be more modest. The Washington Post revisited this question based on a new incident in July 2007, which provoked a widespread round of media self-criticism about whether it was a legitimate topic or not; the Clinton campaign then used claimed outrage at the reporting for fundraising purposes.

By the time the campaign was in full force in December 2007,  American communications studies professor Kathleen Hall Jamieson observed that there was a large amount of misogyny present about Clinton on the Internet, up to and including Facebook and other sites devoted to depictions reducing Clinton to sexual humiliation.  She also said that "We know that there's language to condemn female speech that doesn't exist for male speech. We call women's speech shrill and strident. And Hillary Clinton's laugh was being described as a cackle," making reference to a flurry of media coverage two months prior about the physical nature and political motivation of her aural indication of amusement. Tanya Romaniuk also described how "the news media reshaped the kinds of meanings and values attached to" Clinton's 'cackle' characterization, "and concomitantly (re)produced and reinforced a stereotypically gendered, negative (i.e., sexist, misogynist) perception of her."

Use against Clinton of the "bitch" epithet flourished during the campaign, especially on the Internet but via conventional media as well.  Hundreds of YouTube videos carried the word, with such titles as "Hillary Clinton: The Bitch is Back" and "Hillary Clinton: Crazy Bitch", and a Facebook groups with the theme proliferated, including one named "Life's a Bitch, Why Vote for One?" that had more than 1,500 members.  Broadcaster Glenn Beck used the term in describing her. In a November 2007 public appearance, John McCain was asked by one of his supporters, "How do we beat the bitch?" (McCain responded by saying, "May I give the translation?" and then went on to say he respected Clinton but could defeat her.)  A February 2008 Saturday Night Live monologue by Tina Fey led a backlash-through-embracing movement, when she said "I think what bothers me the most is when people say that Hillary is a bitch. Let me say something about that. Yeah, she is. And so am I.... You know what? Bitches get stuff done.... Get on board. Bitch is the new black!"  A new Facebook group "Bitch is the new Black" gained three times the membership of all the anti-Clinton groups named after the word.

Along this theme, PBS commentator Bill Moyers noted that MSNBC commentator Tucker Carlson had said of Clinton, "There's just something about her that feels castrating, overbearing, and scary," and that top-rated radio talk show host Rush Limbaugh continued to refer to her as "the woman with the testicle lockbox."  During the campaign, Carlson made repeated statements of the form "When she comes on television, I involuntarily cross my legs."  Further discussion ensued when the Drudge Report and a few other media outlets ran an unflattering Associated Press photograph of Clinton looking old and tired on the wintry Iowa campaign trail; Limbaugh sympathized with the plight of American women in an appearance-obsessed culture, then asked, "Will this country want to actually watch a woman get older before their eyes on a daily basis?"

Following Clinton's "choked up moment" in New Hampshire and surprise victory there the following day, discussion of gender's role in the campaign moved front and center. Clinton's win in New Hampshire was the first time a woman had ever won a major American party's presidential primary for the purposes of delegate selection. (Shirley Chisholm's prior "win" in New Jersey in 1972 was in a no-delegate-awarding, presidential preference ballot that the major candidates were not listed in and that the only other candidate who was listed had already withdrawn from; the actual delegate selection vote went to George McGovern.) Women following the campaign recalled a series of criticisms of Clinton, such as the pitch of her voice, a debate moderator's question of whether she was "likeable" (and Obama's reply that she was "likeable enough", felt by some to be condescending), and hecklers' demands that she "iron their shirt", as motivations for re-examining who they would support in the contest.

Later in January 2008, Clinton backed out of a cover photo shoot with Vogue over concerns by the Clinton camp that she would appear "too feminine," which prompted the magazine's editor-in-chief, Anna Wintour, to write, "Imagine my amazement, then, when I learned that Hillary Clinton, our only female presidential hopeful, had decided to steer clear of our pages at this point in her campaign for fear of looking too feminine. The notion that a contemporary woman must look mannish in order to be taken seriously as a seeker of power is frankly dismaying. How has our culture come to this? How is it that The Washington Post recoils from the slightest hint of cleavage on a senator? This is America, not Saudi Arabia. It's also 2008: Margaret Thatcher may have looked terrific in a blue power suit, but that was 20 years ago. I do think Americans have moved on from the power-suit mentality, which served as a bridge for a generation of women to reach boardrooms filled with men. Political campaigns that do not recognize this are making a serious misjudgment."

Sarah Palin comparison
Following the nomination of Sarah Palin for the vice presidency at the Republican National Convention, Palin and Clinton were compared and contrasted with one another in the media, due to their status as women running in the 2008 presidential election. A New York Times article stated, "Mrs. Clinton and Ms. Palin have little in common beyond their breakout performances at the conventions and the soap opera aspects of their family lives. Mrs. Clinton always faces high expectations; Mrs. Palin faced low expectations this week, and benefited from them. Mrs. Clinton can seem harsh when she goes on the attack; Mrs. Palin has shown a knack for attacking without seeming nasty. Mrs. Clinton has a lot of experience; Ms. Palin, not so much. Mrs. Clinton is pantsuits; Mrs. Palin is skirts." Guy Cecil, the former political director of Mrs. Clinton's campaign, said it was "insulting" for Republicans to compare Palin to Clinton. A Saturday Night Live skit, "A Nonpartisan Message From Governor Sarah Palin & Senator Hillary Clinton", counterposed Palin, played by Tina Fey, against Hillary Clinton, played by Amy Poehler. Fey presented Palin as a dimwit unable to understand global politics, as emphasized by the line: "I can see Russia from my house." Former Hewlett-Packard chief executive and McCain advisor Carly Fiorina blasted that one of the Saturday Night Live parodies of Sarah Palin in a television interview: "They were defining Hillary Clinton as very substantive and Sarah Palin as totally superficial," and an ABC News headline soon after ran, "Now the McCain Campaign's Complaining that Saturday Night Live Skit Was 'Sexist'".  However, Palin stated that she found the skit amusing.

"Hillary is missing in action from the Palin-hating brigade", opines a writer at the Weekly Standard. Former Democratic presidential candidate Hillary Clinton referred to Palin's VP nomination as "historic," stating, ""We should all be proud of Governor Sarah Palin's historic nomination, and I congratulate her and Senator McCain...While their policies would take America in the wrong direction, Governor Palin will add an important new voice to the debate." Wisconsin Congresswoman Tammy Baldwin expressed a different view: "To the extent that this choice represents an effort to court supporters of Hillary Clinton's historic candidacy, McCain misjudges the reasons so many voters rallied around her candidacy. It was Senator Clinton's experience, skill and commitment to change, especially in the areas of health care and energy policy, that drew such strong support. Sarah Palin's opposition to Roe v. Wade and her support of big oil will not draw Democrats from the Obama-Biden ticket." President of the National Organization for Women (NOW) Kim Gandy said "What McCain does not understand is that women supported Hillary Clinton not just because she was a woman, but because she was a champion on their issues. They will surely not find Sarah Palin to be an advocate for women."

In mid September 2008, a flurry of articles circulated announcing that "Hillary Clinton and Sarah Palin plan to appear next week at the same rally in New York City – perhaps the closest the two history-making women will be to each other before Election Day." However, Clinton pulled out of her scheduled appearance at the rally protesting Iranian President Mahmoud Ahmadinejad when she found out Palin would also be there. "Clinton decided not to attend because she did not want to take part in a "partisan political event"," her aide said. Soon after, organizers of the rally in New York withdrew their invitation to Palin.

Opinion polling

See also
 Statewide opinion polling for the 2008 Democratic Party presidential primaries
 Nationwide opinion polling for the 2008 United States presidential election
 Political positions of Hillary Clinton
 Hillary Clinton 2016 presidential campaign

Bibliography

Notes and references

External links

 
Clinton's 2008 Presidential announcement on C-SPAN

 
Clinton presidential campaign
presidential campaign 2008
2008 in women's history